Highway 107 in Nova Scotia runs through the eastern suburbs of the Halifax Regional Municipality, from the Burnside Industrial Park in Dartmouth to an intersection with Trunk 7 in Musquodoboit Harbour.

Route description
From its current western terminus at the intersection of Akerley Boulevard and Burnside Drive in Burnside, Highway 107 travels northeast to its interchange with Highway 118, then continues southeast on the Forest Hills Extension to an intersection of Main Street in Dartmouth and Trunk 7 in Westphal. Near Preston, Highway 107 and Trunk 7 split, and Highway 107 continues eastward as a controlled access two-lane highway for the remainder of its route. The highway travels past the communities of Preston, Lake Echo, Porters Lake and Head of Chezzetcook before reaching its eastern terminus with Trunk 7 west of Musquodoboit Harbour.

History

Dartmouth to Musquodoboit Harbour section
Construction of the highway began in 1972/73. The first segment, running from Trunk 7 to Mineville Road, opened to traffic during the 1975/76 fiscal year. At that time a further extension of the road, across Lake Echo, was under construction.

Grading work for the final segment from Head of Chezzetcook (exit 20) to Musquodoboit Harbour began in 1986/87.

Dartmouth Bypass
The section of Highway 107 between Trunk 7 (at Forest Hills) and Highway 118 was also known as the Dartmouth Bypass. The first section of the bypass (from Trunk 7 to the interchange at Montague Road) opened to traffic in 1985/86. The remaining section, connecting to Highway 118, opened in 1986/87.

A short extension to Akerley Boulevard in the Burnside Industrial Park was constructed in the early 1990s.

Burnside/Sackville extension
The highway is being extended from Akerley Boulevard along the southwestern side of Anderson Lake and from there continuing north to connect to Duke Street/Glendale Avenue near exit 4C on Highway 102. This extension, known locally as the Burnside Expressway, will allow commuters from Halifax and Burnside heading to Sackville to bypass the Bedford Bypass and Windmill Road and instead go through Burnside and connect directly into Sackville. Construction is in progress.

Exit list

References

External links

Lake Echo Webcam on Highway 107
Highway 107 Extension

Nova Scotia provincial highways
Roads in Halifax, Nova Scotia
Limited-access roads in Canada